The Eleventh Hour may refer to:

 "The eleventh hour", a phrase in the Parable of the Workers in the Vineyard in the Bible

Film
 The Eleventh Hour (1912 film), an Australian silent film
 The Eleventh Hour (1922 film), a British adaptation of one of Ethel M. Dell's romance novels
 The Eleventh Hour (1923 film), an American film directed by Bernard J. Durning
 Eleventh Hour (1942 animated film), a Superman cartoon
 Eleventh Hour (1942 documentary film), an Australian short documentary film
 The 11th Hour (2007 film), an American documentary narrated by Leonardo DiCaprio, on the state of the natural environment
 The 11th Hour (2014 film), a German/Danish drama/thriller film

Television
 The 11th Hour, a Canadian sketch comedy show on CBC starring Nancy Robertson and Ian Boothby
 The 11th Hour (news program), a 2016 American newscast on MSNBC initially anchored by Brian Williams
 The Eleventh Hour (1962 TV series), a 1962–1964 American medical drama that aired on NBC
 The Eleventh Hour (Canadian TV series), a 2002–2005 Canadian drama series that aired on CTV
 Eleventh Hour (British TV series), a British television series broadcast for one series of four episodes in 2006
 Eleventh Hour (American TV series), an American television series broadcast for one season of 18 episodes from 2008–2009
 The Eleventh Hour (branding), brand names given to local newscasts on NBC television stations from the mid-1960s until about 1974
 "The Eleventh Hour" (Doctor Who), an episode of the British television series Doctor Who debuting the Eleventh Doctor
 "The Eleventh Hour," an episode of the American television series Make It or Break It
 The Eleventh Hour, an Australian sketch comedy that aired on HSV-7 in 1985
 "Eleventh Hour", an episode of the fourth season of Wentworth
 "11th Hour", an episode of 60 Days In

Literature
 The Eleventh Hour (book), by Graeme Base
 11th Hour (novel), a novel by James Patterson and Maxine Paetro, part of the Women's Murder Club series
 Eleventh Hour, a 2018 book by Hussain Zaidi

Music
 The Eleventh Hour (Jars of Clay album), 2002, containing a song of that same title
 The Eleventh Hour (Magnum album), 1983
 The Eleventh Hour (Evan Parker album), 2004
 The Eleventh Hour (The Birthday Suit album), 2011
 Eleventh Hour (Del the Funky Homosapien album), 2008
 Eleventh Hour (Fred Frith album), 2005
 "The Eleventh Hour", a song by August Burns Red on the album Messengers
 "The Eleventh Hour", a song by Fates Warning on the album Parallels
 "Eleventh Hour", a song by Yngwie Malmsteen on the album Perpetual Flame
 "The 11th Hour", a song by Rancid on the album ...And Out Come the Wolves
 "The 11th Hour", a song by The Tea Party on the album The Ocean at the End
 "The 11th Hour", a music project by Ed Warby
 ""11th Hour", a song by Lamb of God on the album As the Palaces Burn
 ""11th Hour", a song by Mushroomhead on the album A Wonderful Life

Other uses
 The 11th Hour (newspaper), an alternative weekly published in Georgia
 The 11th Hour (video game), a 1995 interactive puzzle game with a horror setting
 The Eleventh Hour (1933 play), a play by Anthony Armstrong
 Vestas 11th Hour Racing, a sailing team and a yacht
 The Eleventh Hour, the fifth chapter of the Balance Arc for the comedy podcast The Adventure Zone

See also
 Armistice Day, which occurred on "the eleventh hour of the eleventh day of the eleventh month" of 1918, when World War I hostilities ended